Sydney Taivavashe (born March 20,1991) is a Zimbabwean film director, producer and screenwriter.

Early life
Sydney Taivavashe was born in 1991 in Masvingo, Zimbabwe where he grew up.

Career 
Sydney made his debut film in 2006, a short film titled The Terrific Nights. His first feature film Through The Night was nominated at 2014 National Arts Merit Awards in the outstanding feature film category.

In 2017, Sydney won a NAMA award for directing Seiko, a silent short film. In the same year he partnered with Great Zimbabwe University to produce feature film Solo naMutsai, portraying the experience of students who come from poor backgrounds at the university. In 2019, Sydney produced an anti-poaching awareness film titled Gonarezhou: The Movie which featured artist Tamy Moyo and Zimbabwe president's daughter Tariro Mnangagwa. In 2021 it was announced that Sydney was working on a movie that documents the life of Zimbabwean iconic spirit medium Mbuya Nehanda.

Filmography
Tamba Wakachengera 2013
Through the night 1 2013
Through the night 2 2016
Seiko (Short Film) 2017 
Solo naMutsai 2018
Gonarezhou: The Movie 2020
The Story of Nehanda 2021
Poor Cousins 2021

Awards

References

External links

Living people
Zimbabwean film directors
1991 births